The Roman Catholic Diocese of Mbaïki is a diocese in Mbaïki in the Ecclesiastical province of Bangui in the Central African Republic.

History
 June 10, 1995: Established as Diocese of Mbaïki from the Metropolitan Archdiocese of Bangui

Leadership
 Bishops of Mbaïki (Roman rite)
 Bishop Guerrino Perin, M.C.C.I. (10 June 1995 – 10 March 2021)
 Bishop Jesús Ruiz Molina, M.C.C.I. (10 March 2021 – present)

See also
Roman Catholicism in the Central African Republic

Sources
 GCatholic.org

Mbaiki
Mbaiki
Christian organizations established in 1995
Roman Catholic dioceses and prelatures established in the 20th century
Lobaye